Government Medical College, Idukki (abbreviated GMCI) is a government medical college in Kerala, India. Established in 2014, the campus is located in Cheruthoni, Idukki. The institute is affiliated to Kerala University of Health Sciences, Thrissur and its MBBS programme is approved by the National Medical Commission (NMC) since 2022.

History
The medical college was established in 2014 and had permission to admit 50 students. But in 2017, the Medical Council of India denied accreditation due to lack of proper infrastructure and facilities and the college could not admit new students. The existing students were shifted to other medical colleges.
In 2022, the National Medical Commission granted approval for admitting 100 students for MBBS.

On November 15, 2022, the college commenced classes for first year MBBS students. 77 students secured admission in the college.

See also
 List of medical colleges in Kerala

References

External links
Official website

Medical colleges in Kerala
Universities and colleges in Idukki district
Educational institutions established in 2014
2014 establishments in Kerala
Idukki